Kamal Sandesh is an Indian magazine which was launched in 1998. The founding editor was Vasant Sathe. It is the national mouthpiece of the Bharatiya Janata Party. Although being the mouthpiece of the party, Kamal Sandesh has on various occasions criticised the leadership of the party. Prabhat Jha is the editor of Kamal Sandesh from September 2006 whereas Shakti Bakshi is serving as the executive editor from September 2010.

See also
Saamana, a Marathi-language newspaper published in Maharashtra

References

External links

1998 establishments in India
Bharatiya Janata Party
English-language magazines published in India
Hindi-language magazines
Magazines established in 1998
Magazines published in Delhi
Monthly magazines published in India
Political magazines published in India